Moldova competed at the 2012 European Athletics Championships held in Helsinki, Finland, between 27 June to 1 July 2012. 6 competitors, 2 men and 4 women took part in 5 events.

Results

Men
Track events

Field events

Women
Track events

Field events

References
 

2012
Nations at the 2012 European Athletics Championships
European Athletics Championships